Xu Junmin (born 22 September 1994) is a Chinese footballer and coach who currently plays as a  midfielder for Kunshan.

Club career
Xu Junmin would be part of the Shanghai Lucky Star Youth Training program before joining Chinese Super League side Shanghai Shenhua who loaned him out to lower league Spanish club CF Crack's. On 27 May 2016, he made his debut for Shenhua in the 2016 Chinese Super League against Tianjin Teda, coming on as a substitute for Cao Yunding in the 89th minute.

On 28 February 2018, Xu transferred to League One side Shanghai Shenxin. He would make his debut on 17 March 2018 in a league game against Qingdao Huanghai in a 3-3 draw. After two seasons at the club, the owner would admit to financial difficulties, which unfortunately saw Xu be part of the team that was relegated and disbanded at the end of the 2019 China League One campaign. He would subsequently join another second tier club in Nantong Zhiyun on 16 May 2020 on a free transfer.

On 10 April 2021 he would join second tier club Kunshan on a free transfer. He would go on to make his debut in a league game on 25 April 2021 against Beijing BSU in a 2-2 draw. He would then go on to establish himself as regular within the team that won the division and promotion to the top tier at the end of the 2022 China League One campaign.

Career statistics 
Statistics accurate as of match played 26 December 2022.

Honours

Club
Kunshan
China League One: 2022

References

External links
 

1994 births
Living people
Chinese footballers
Chinese expatriate footballers
Footballers from Shanghai
Association football midfielders
Shanghai Shenhua F.C. players
Shanghai Shenxin F.C. players
Nantong Zhiyun F.C. players
China League One players
Chinese Super League players
Expatriate footballers in Spain
Chinese expatriate sportspeople in Spain